San Nicolò dell'isola is a Romanesque style, Roman Catholic parish church in the town of Sestri Levante, in the Liguria, Italy. The temple's construction dates from the 12th to the 17th century. 

Built originally in 1151, the building, including the facade, was partially reconstructed in the 15th century. and further altered during the Baroque period. More recent renovations have highlighted some of the original structure. The façade has a pseudo-portal porch topped by a triple lancet window, the sides are walled medieval tombstones and inscriptions, in the left, a fragment of the 8th-century chancel enclosure. The bell tower has a pyramid-shaped spire. The interior has three naves divided by columns with cubic capitals.

See also
 Sestri Levante
 Basilica di Santa Maria di Nazareth 
 Diocese of Chiavari

References 
 Nadia Pazzini Paglieri; Rinangelo Paglieri, Chiese in Liguria, Genova, Sagep Editrice, 1990. 

Italian Riviera
Churches in the province of Genoa
12th-century Roman Catholic church buildings in Italy
Romanesque architecture in Liguria